is a major interchange railway station located in the city of Yokkaichi, Mie Prefecture, Japan, operated by the private railway operator Kintetsu Railway. The third-sector Yokkaichi Asunarou Railway, which is jointly owned by Kintetsu and the city of Yokkaichi, uses a part of the station as its terminal .

Lines
Kintetsu-Yokkaichi  Station is served by the Nagoya Line, and is located 41.9 rail kilometers from the starting point of the line at Ise-Nakagawa Station. It is also a terminus for the 15.4 kilometer Kintetsu Yunoyama Line The Yokkaichi Asunarou Railway Utsube Line terminates at this station.

Station layout 
Kintetsu-Yokkaichi Station consists of three island platforms serving six tracks on the third level of a station building. The Asunarou Yokkaichi Station consists of a single island platform on the ground level of the same building.

Adjacent stations

History

In 1956 when Kinki Nippon Railway (Kintetsu) rerouted the Nagoya Line and closed its station by JNR's Yokkaichi Station, Suwa Station of Kintetsu and Mie Transport was moved and renamed as Kinki Nippon Yokkaichi Station. The station was again renamed in 1970 to the present name.

 1913-05-16 Mie tramway Suwa - Minami-Hamada opened.
 1913-09-24 Yokkaichi Railway Suwa - Ise-Kawashima opened.
 1915-12-25 Mie tramway Yokkaichi - Suwa opened.
 1916-03-03 Yokkaichi Railway Yokkaichi - Suwa opened.
 1916-07-19 Mie tramway was inherited by Mie Railway.
 1922-03-01 Ise Railway Miyamado - Shin-Yokkaichi open.
 1929-01-30 Ise Electric Railway Kuwana - Yokkaichi and Suwa stn. opened.
 1931-03-01 Yokkaichi Railway and Mie Railway merged to Mie Railway.
 1936-09-15 Sangu Express Railway merged Ise Electric railway.
 1941-03-15 Osaka Electric Tramway merged Sangu Express Railway and Osaka Electric Tramway was changed to Kansai Express Railway.
 1944-02-11 Mie railway and other 6 companies merged to Mie Transport.
 1944-06-01 Kansai Express Railway was changed to Kinki Nippon Railway (Kintetsu).
 1956-09-23 Kintetsu Line moved to new line. Yokkaichi Station of Kintetsu near JNR Yokkaichi Station was closed. Suwa Station was moved and its name was changed to Kinki Nippon Yokkaichi.
 1964-02-01 Mie Transport transferred its railway business to Mie Electric Railway.
 1965-04-01 Kinki Nippon Railway merged Mie Electric Railway.
 1970-03-01 Kinki Nippon Yokkaichi was changed to Kintetsu Yokkaichi.
 1973 Nagoya Line and Yunoyama Line were elevated.
 1974-06-29 Utsube Line Yokkaichi Station was moved.

Passenger statistics
In fiscal 2019, the Kintetsu station was used by an average of 24,163 passengers daily (boarding passengers only). During the same period, the Yokkaichi Asunarou Railway portion of the station was used by 6198 passengers daily.

Surrounding area 
 Kintetsu department store
 LaLa Square shopping center
 Yokkaichi Dome
 Yokkaichi Museum

See also
List of railway stations in Japan

References

External links

 Kintetsu: Kintetsu-Yokkaichi Station
1945 map (University of Texas Libraries)

Railway stations in Japan opened in 1913
Railway stations in Mie Prefecture
Yokkaichi